Quercus macrocalyx is a tree species in the beech family Fagaceae There are no known subspecies. It is placed in subgenus Cerris, section Cyclobalanopsis.

This oak tree grows up to 20 m tall and has been recorded from Vietnam, where it may be called sồi đấu to.

References

External links
 

macrocalyx
Flora of Indo-China
Trees of Vietnam
Taxa named by Aimée Antoinette Camus